Media Township is one of eleven townships in Henderson County, Illinois, USA.  As of the 2010 census, its population was 392 and it contained 186 housing units.

Geography

Cities, towns, villages
 Media
 Stronghurst (east quarter)

Cemeteries
The township contains these three cemeteries: Adair, Davidson and Walnut Grove.

Major highways
  Illinois Route 94
  Illinois Route 116

Airports and landing strips
 Neff Airport

Demographics

School districts
 West Central Community Unit School District 235

Political districts
 Illinois's 17th congressional district
 State House District 94
 State Senate District 47

References
 United States Census Bureau 2008 TIGER/Line Shapefiles
 
 United States National Atlas

External links
 City-Data.com
 Illinois State Archives
 Township Officials of Illinois

Townships in Henderson County, Illinois
1906 establishments in Illinois
Populated places established in 1906
Townships in Illinois